The women's halfpipe competition of the FIS Freestyle World Ski Championships 2011 was held at Park City Mountain Resort, Park City, Utah, United States on February 5 (qualifying and finals).

Qualification

The following are the results of the qualification.

Final

References

Halfpipe, women's